The Soul Sessions is the debut studio album by English singer and songwriter Joss Stone, released on 16 September 2003 by S-Curve Records. The album consists of cover versions of soul songs from the 1960s and 1970s, in addition to a cover of the White Stripes' 2001 song "Fell in Love with a Girl". In 2004, The Soul Sessions was shortlisted for the Mercury Prize and was nominated for a MOBO Award for Best Album.

Background
The Soul Sessions was produced by Miami soul singer Betty Wright and S-Curve Records chief executive officer Steve Greenberg. Stone worked with veteran Miami soul musicians Benny Latimore, Little Beaver, Timmy Thomas and Wright herself. She also worked with contemporary musicians such as neo soul singer Angie Stone and the alternative hip hop group the Roots.

Stone told MTV News that she felt intimidated by the credentials of the musicians that worked on the album. "It was weird because they've worked with so many great, great singers. I'm talking the best. I kind of walked in, just like this little girl and started singing."

Critical reception

The Soul Sessions received positive reviews from music critics. At Metacritic, which assigns a normalised rating out of 100 to reviews from mainstream publications, the album received an average score of 74, based on 15 reviews. Jon Caramanica of Rolling Stone stated that "Stone shines on this impressive covers set" and that "[s]he chooses songs wisely." AllMusic's Thom Jurek wrote that Stone "has unique phrasing and a huge voice that accents, dips, and slips, never overworking a song or trying to bring attention to itself via hollow acrobatics." Jim Greer from Entertainment Weekly noted that Stone "does have an extraordinary voice", but added that "the only misguided ploy on The Soul Sessions is a Roots-produced slo-mo cover of a White Stripes tune." Russell Baillie from The New Zealand Herald opined that "with her strong, emotive voice she nails it time and again, and with performances that aren't an excuse for the vocal acrobatic show you imagine this would have been had Stone been America's next bright young thing."

The Guardians Dorian Lynskey described her singing as "rich, mature and agile but not showy". Nick Duerden of Blender magazine commented that "Stone's voice is remarkably authentic, and the atmosphere she conjures is smoky and sleazy, pure mid-'60s Detroit." Jason MacNeil wrote for PopMatters that her voice is "more of a soulful voice than those so-called soul divas out there today" and that it "oozes sex appeal as Benny Latimore's piano weaves some magic." At The A.V. Club, Keith Phipps remarked that "Sessions establishes Stone as a formidable interpreter." Andrew McGregor of BBC Music felt that the album "seems a bit of an artistic compromise, music from the rule book rather than the heart." Similarly, The Village Voice critic Robert Christgau viewed Stone's covers as "the kind of soul marginalia Brits have been overrating since Doris Troy was on Apple".

Commercial performance

The Soul Sessions entered the UK Albums Chart at number 89 for the week ending 10 January 2004, peaking at number four in its fifth week on the chart. The British Phonographic Industry (BPI) certified the album triple platinum on 15 April 2005, and by July 2012, it had sold 1,075,492 copies in the United Kingdom. Additionally, it became the 16th best-selling album of 2004 in the UK.

In the United States, The Soul Sessions was a sleeper hit. On the issue dated 4 October 2003, the album debuted at number 199 on the Billboard 200 and at number 76 on the Top R&B/Hip-Hop Albums, peaking at number 39 on the former and at number 38 on the latter in its 24th week on both charts, on the issue dated 8 May 2004. Prior to that, the album topped the Top Heatseekers chart during the week of 21 February 2004. Sales were high on the East Coast, especially in cities such as New York City, Philadelphia and Boston. Within six months of its release, The Soul Sessions was certified gold by the Recording Industry Association of America (RIAA) on 29 March 2004. The album had sold 981,000 units in the US as of July 2011.

The album was also commercially successful in the rest of Europe, where it reached number four in Austria, Germany, the Netherlands and Norway, number five in Portugal, number seven in Belgium, number eight in Italy, number 12 in Sweden and number 14 in Switzerland, as well as number four on the European Top 100 Albums. In June 2004, The Soul Sessions was awarded a Platinum Europe Award by the International Federation of the Phonographic Industry (IFPI) for sales in excess of one million copies across Europe. In Oceania, the album peaked at number 16 in Australia and number eight in New Zealand, earning platinum accreditations from the Australian Recording Industry Association (ARIA) and the Recording Industry Association of New Zealand (RIANZ) for sales in excess of 70,000 and 15,000 copies, respectively. The Soul Sessions had sold five million copies worldwide as of June 2012.

Track listing
All tracks are produced by Betty Wright, Steve Greenberg and Michael Mangini, except "Fell in Love with a Boy" and "The Player", produced by Ahmir "Questlove" Thompson, Wright, Greenberg and Mangini, and "I've Fallen in Love with You", produced by Greenberg and Mangini.

Personnel
Credits adapted from the liner notes of The Soul Sessions.

Musicians

 Joss Stone – vocals
 Willie "Little Beaver" Hale – guitar 
 Timmy Thomas – organ 
 Benny Latimore – piano 
 Jack Daley – bass 
 Cindy Blackman – drums 
 Angelo Morris – acoustic guitar ; guitar ; organ ; keyboards 
 Betty Wright – background vocals 
 Jeanette Wright – background vocals 
 Namphuyo Aisha McCray – background vocals 
 Ignacio Nunez – percussion 
 Mike Mangini – tambourine 
 Angie Stone – background vocals 
 Ahmir "Questlove" Thompson – drums 
 Kirk Douglas – guitar 
 Adam Blackstone – bass 
 James Poyser – keyboards 
 Kamal – keyboards 
 Jimmy Farkus – acoustic guitar 
 John Angier – string arrangement 
 Danny Pierre – keyboards 
 Mark Ciprit – guitar 
 Sam Furnace – saxophone 
 Steve Greenwell – bass 
 Taneka Duggan – background vocals 
 Deanna Carroll – background vocals 
 Sandra Park – violin 
 Lisa Kim – violin 
 Sharon Yamada – violin 
 Myung Hi Kim – violin 
 Fiona Simon – violin 
 Sarah Kim – violin 
 Laura Seaton – violin 
 Liz Lim – violin 
 Soo Hyun Kwon – violin 
 Jenny Strenger – violin 
 Jung Sun Yoo – violin 
 Rob Shaw – violin 
 Karen Dreyfus – viola 
 Robert Rinehart – viola 
 Dawn Hannay – viola 
 Tom Rosenfeld – viola 
 Alan Stepansky – cello 
 Sarah Seiver – cello 
 Jeremy Turner – cello 
 Leanne LeBlanc – cello

Technical
 Betty Wright – production 
 Steve Greenberg – production, executive production
 Michael Mangini – production
 Steve Greenwell – engineering, mixing
 Ahmir "Questlove" Thompson – production 
 Chris Gehringer – mastering at Sterling Sound (New York City)

Artwork
 David Gorman – art direction, design
 Bryan Lasley – art direction, design
 Charles Allen Smith – photography
 Karen Fuchs – photography

Charts

Weekly charts

Year-end charts

Certifications

Release history

Notes

References

2003 debut albums
Albums produced by Questlove
Covers albums
Joss Stone albums
S-Curve Records albums
Virgin Records albums